Júlio César Martins (born 4 January 1978 in Londrina, Brazil) is a Brazilian footballer. He currently plays as a goalkeeper for Red Bull Brasil.

Júlio César has played for Santo André at Copa do Brasil 2004, played 3 matches, behind first choice Júnior Costa. But at 2005 Copa Libertadores, he played as first choice.

In December 2007 he signed a one-year contract with São Caetano, Santo André's club rival. He was offered a one-year extension in December 2008.

Honours
Copa do Brasil: 2004

Career statistics

References

External links
 Profile at CBF 
 Profile at Futpedia 

Brazilian footballers
Esporte Clube Santo André players
Marília Atlético Clube players
Associação Desportiva São Caetano players
Botafogo Futebol Clube (SP) players
Associação Atlética Ponte Preta players
Red Bull Brasil players
Association football goalkeepers
Sportspeople from Londrina
1978 births
Living people